Zubair Torwali is a community activist, linguist and educator based in Bahrain, Pakistan who has sought to preserve and promote Pakistan's Dardic cultures and languages. He has authored and supervised a number of books in and about Torwali. His book in English, Muffled Voices, provides insight into Pakistan's social, cultural, and political issues. Zubair Torwali is the Editor of "We Mountains" magazine which covers the culture of the Pakistani Himalayas. The author is a prolific writer of research papers and articles written for English dailies and weeklies of Pakistan. He is the founder of Idara Baraye Taleem-o-Taraqi, an organisation promoting the rights of marginalised language communities of northern Pakistan. He is author, researcher and public speaker. 
He is a member of the Human Rights Commission of Pakistan, a Fellow of Japan's 2013 Asian Leadership Fellow Program and was shortlisted for the International Bremen Peace Award 2015. Mr. Torwali is also a Public Peace Prize laureate 
"…for his extraordinary commitment to giving a voice to the unheard by helping increase literacy in the indigenous people of Northern Pakistan".
 He was awarded the 2012 Hellman-Hammett Grant by Human Rights Watch." In 2021 I.B.T. whose Director is Zubair Torwali was chosen for the Linguapax International Award. A graduate of Jahanzeb College in Swat, Pakistan, he has completed master's studies at University of Peshawar.

Works

Books
 Vestiges of Torwali Culture by Zubair Torwali
 Muffled Voices, Longing for a Pluralist and Peaceful Pakistan by Zubair Torwali
 Paradise Visage by authors including Zubair Torwali

Academic journals
 Criterion Quarterly: Malakand Division: Conflicts, Floods and Response by Zubair Torwali
 Criterion Quarterly: The Ignored Dardic Culture of Swat by Zubair Torwali
 Journal of Languages and Culture: The Ignored Dardic Culture of Swat by Zubair Torwali
 Brandeis University: International Justice: Language Culture and Justice Hub: Zubair Torwali, Contributing Member]
 American Pakistan Foundation: Linguistic Diversity in Pakistan, interview of Zubair Torwali 
 Aeon Essays: How Dardistan became one of the most multilingual places on Earth by Zubair Torwali

References

External links
 Google Scholars: Pakistan: Zubair Torwali                                                                                               

Living people
Dard people
Pakistani democracy activists
People from Swat District
Pakistani social scientists
Humanities academics
Year of birth missing (living people)